Perseus and Andromeda is a text adventure video game released in  1983 by Digital Fantasia on the Mysterious Adventures label. It was available for the ZX Spectrum, Atari 8-bit, Acorn Electron, BBC Micro, Commodore 64, Dragon 32/64, and Oric-1.

Perseus and Andromeda was written by Brian Howarth in Scott Adams database. The story is an adaptation of the Greek myth of Perseus and includes characters and artifacts such as the winged sandals, Pegasus, the harpies and Medusa. The objective is to save Andromeda from the sea-monster Ceto.

References

External links
 
 
 

1980s interactive fiction
1983 video games
Atari 8-bit family games
BBC Micro and Acorn Electron games
Commodore 16 and Plus/4 games
Commodore 64 games
Dragon 32 games
Oric games
Video games based on Greek mythology
Video games developed in the United Kingdom
ZX Spectrum games